The Moon Area School District is located about 16 miles northwest of Pittsburgh, Pennsylvania.  It serves a portion of the West Hills/Airport Area and comprises Crescent and Moon townships, which include unincorporated villages such as Glenwillard, Wireton, Coraopolis Heights, Thorn Hollow, West Coraopolis, Carnot, Thorn Run Valley, and Mooncrest. Moon Area School District encompasses approximately 31 square miles. The district's administration offices are located inside Moon Area High School, at 8353 University Boulevard, Moon Township, PA 15108.

Facilities
The district currently manages seven schools:
 Allard Elementary (grades K-4) - located in western Moon Township, 170 Shafer Road, Moon Township, PA 15108
 Hyde Elementary (grades K-4) - located in eastern Moon Township, 110 Wallridge Drive, Moon Township, PA 15108
 Brooks Elementary (grades K-4) - located in Coraopolis Heights, 1720 Hassam Road, Moon Township, PA 15108
 Bon Meade Elementary (grades K-4) - located in Bon Meade, on the Beaver County line, 1595 Brodhead Road, Moon Township, PA 15108
 McCormick Elementary (grades K-4) - located 5 miles south of Moon, 2801 Beaver Grade Road, Moon Township, PA 15108
 Moon Area Middle School (grades 5-8) - located in Moon, 904 Beaver Grade Road, Moon Township, PA 15108
 Moon Area High School (grades 9-12) - located in Moon, 8353 University Boulevard, Moon Township, PA 15108

References

External links
 

School districts in Allegheny County, Pennsylvania
Education in Pittsburgh area
Moon Township, Allegheny County, Pennsylvania
School districts established in 1932